The American Academy of Optometry (AAO) is an organization of optometrists based in Orlando, Florida. Its goal is to maintain and enhance excellence in optometric practice, by both promoting research and the dissemination of knowledge.

The AAO holds an annual meeting, publishes a monthly scientific journal, gives credentials to optometrists through the fellowship process and publishes position statements.

See also
 Optometry and Vision Science: the AAO's journal
 American Optometric Association
 College of Optometrists in Vision Development

References

Optometry
Eye care in the United States
Medical and health organizations based in Florida
Organizations based in Orlando, Florida